Visa requirements for Dominican citizens are administrative entry restrictions imposed by the authorities of foreign states on citizens of Dominica. As of October 2022, Dominica citizens had visa-free or visa on arrival access (including eTAs) to 145 countries and territories, ranking the Dominican passport 34th in the world in terms of travel freedom (tied with the Taiwanese passport) according to the Henley Passport Index.

Visa requirement map

Visa requirements 
Visa requirements for holders of normal passports traveling for tourist purposes:

Dependent, Disputed, or Restricted territories
Unrecognized or partially recognized countries

Dependent and autonomous territories

See also
 Visa policy of Dominica
 Caribbean passport

References and Notes
References

Notes

Dominica
Foreign relations of Dominica